The Florida panther is a type of cougar native to Florida.

Florida panther may also refer to:

Florida Panthers, an NHL hockey team.
FIU Panthers, the athletic program of Florida International University